Leucobryum is a genus of haplolepideous mosses (Dicranidae) in the family Leucobryaceae. The name comes from the Greek leukos, meaning white, and bryon, meaning moss.

Description 
Leucobryum species are in found in erect, dense, and often rounded cushions. Their color varies from white to grayish or bluish-green. Species are characterized by having thick, whitish leaves with a large, expanded costa. It has been suggested that the characteristic pale color exhibited by some species is caused by air bubbles in the leucocysts. The bubbles are theorized to be necessary for the function of the chlorocysts for the purpose of gas exchange.

Species are dioecious, with male plants stunted and found growing among the leaves of the female plants. Sporophytes are rare.

There are approximately 122 species of Leucobryum worldwide. Only two species are known to occur in North America.

Species
Species adapted from The Plant List;

Leucobryum acutifolium 
Leucobryum aduncum 
Leucobryum albicans 
Leucobryum albidum 
Leucobryum antillarum 
Leucobryum arfakianum 
Leucobryum boninense 
Leucobryum boryanum 
Leucobryum bowringii 
Leucobryum candidum 
Leucobryum chlorophyllosum 
Leucobryum clavatum 
Leucobryum crispum 
Leucobryum giganteum 
Leucobryum glaucum 
Leucobryum gracile 
Leucobryum guadalupense 
Leucobryum humillimum 
Leucobryum incurvifolium 
Leucobryum iridans 
Leucobryum javense 
Leucobryum juniperoideum 
Leucobryum madagassum 
Leucobryum martianum 
Leucobryum mayottense 
Leucobryum neilgherrense 
Leucobryum neocaledonicum 
Leucobryum piliferum 
Leucobryum propaguliferum 
Leucobryum pungens 
Leucobryum rehmannii 
Leucobryum sanctum 
Leucobryum seemannii 
Leucobryum sphagnoides 
Leucobryum subobtusifolium 
Leucobryum sumatranum

References

Dicranales
Moss genera